Sanguiin H-6 is an ellagitannin.

Natural occurrence 
Sanguiin H-6 can be found in Rosaceae such as the great burnet (Sanguisorba officinalis), in strawberries (Fragaria × ananassa) and in Rubus species such as red raspberries (Rubus idaeus) or cloudberries (Rubus chamaemorus).

Chemistry 
Sanguiin H-6 is dimer of casuarictin linked by a bond between the gallic acid residue and one of the hexahydroxydiphenic acid units. It has sanguisorbic acid ester groups as linking units between glucopyranose moieties.

Sanguiin H-6 contributes to the antioxidant capacity of raspberries.

It is an isomer of agrimoniin.

References

External links
 Sanguiin H-6 on www.phenol-explorer.eu

Ellagitannins
Tannin dimers